Witold Józef Karaś (born 20 October 1951) is a Polish former football manager and former player, who played as a forward.

Career
He started his career with Zenit Nisko in 1964, and played two matches for the Polish national team – both against Haiti in 1974. After leaving Nisko, he played for Stal Mielec in the Ekstraklasa and then had a stint in Austria. He managed Stal Mielec for two spells.

On 14 July 2007, he won the Polish Junior Championships as a coach of Stal Mielec.

International matches
Scores and results table. Poland's goal tally first:

References

External links
 

1951 births
Living people
People from Nisko
Polish footballers
Association football forwards
Sokół Nisko players
Stal Mielec players
Ekstraklasa players
Poland international footballers
Polish expatriate footballers
Expatriate footballers in Austria
Polish expatriate sportspeople in Austria
Polish football managers
Stal Mielec managers